Ben Arbuckle (born September 15, 1995) is an American football coach and former player who is the offensive coordinator for the Washington State Cougars football team.

Playing career
Arbuckle grew up in Canadian, Texas and attended Canadian High School. He became Canadian's starting quarterback going into his junior season. Arbuckle passed for over 7,500 yards and with 95 touchdown passes during his high school career.

Arbuckle originally intended to play college football at UTSA, but decided to step away from the game. He later enrolled at West Texas A&M University and joined the West Texas A&M Buffaloes football team after a two year hiatus from the sport. Arbuckle started seven games as a junior and passed for 1,241 yards and 15 touchdowns. He competed for the Buffaloes' starting quarterback job going into his senior season, but was not named the starter.

Coaching career
Arbuckle began his coaching career as an offensive quality control assistant at Houston Baptist University. He spent two years at that position.  Arbuckle worked with Zach Kittley to coach Bailey Zappe and the rest of the Houston Baptist offense. Arbuckle was hired as the offensive coordinator and quarterbacks coach at Seminole High School in Seminole, Texas, in the summer of 2020.

Western Kentucky
In 2021, Arbuckle was hired as a quality control coach at Western Kentucky University (WKU) by former Houston Baptist offensive coordinator Zach Kittley. Arbuckle was promoted to quarterbacks coach and co-offensive coordinator after Kittley left at the end of the 2021 to become the offensive coordinator at Texas Tech. Arbuckle was promoted to quarterbacks coach and co-offensive coordinator after Kittley left at the end of the 2021 to become the offensive coordinator at Texas Tech. Western Kentucky's offense finished sixth nationally in yards per game, first in total passing yards, and 15th in points per game with Arbuckle as the primary play caller in 2022.

Washington State
Arbuckle was hired as the offensive coordinator at Washington State in January 2023. At 27, he was the youngest Power 5 primary coordinator in the country at the time of the hire.

References

External links
 West Texas A&M Buffaloes player bio
 Western Kentucky Hilltoppers coaching bio

Living people
1995 births
American football quarterbacks
West Texas A&M Buffaloes football players
Houston Christian Huskies football coaches
Western Kentucky Hilltoppers football coaches
Washington State Cougars football coaches
People from Canadian, Texas
People from Wichita Falls, Texas